Jeremiah Francis Minihan (July 21, 1903 – August 14, 1973) was an American prelate of the Roman Catholic Church. He served as an auxiliary bishop of the Archdiocese of Boston from 1954 until his death in 1973.

Biography

Early life and education
Jeremiah Minihan was born in Haverhill, Massachusetts, one of two sons of Timothy and Nora Agnes (née Duggan) Minihan. His parents were both Irish immigrants; his father was from County Cork and his mother was from County Kerry. He received his early education at the parochial school of St. James Church in his native city. He then attended Georgetown University in Washington, D.C., graduating in 1925. At Georgetown, he played as a lineman on the football team; the Jeremiah Minihan Coaches Award, presented the student who has made an outstanding contribution to the team, is named in his honor.

However, Minihan gave up his promising athletic career to study for the priesthood. He studied at the Pontifical Urban University in Rome, where he earned a doctorate in theology in 1930.

Ordination and ministry
Minihan was ordained a priest in Rome on December 21, 1929. Following his return to Massachusetts, he was assigned as a curate at St. Paul Church in Cambridge. He served as assistant chancellor of the Archdiocese of Boston (1931–33) and secretary to Cardinal William Henry O'Connell (1933–43).

Minihan was named a Monsignor in 1936. In 1943, he became chancellor of the archdiocese and pastor of St. Catherine Church in Norwood. He also served as pastor of St. Theresa Church in West Roxbury, diocesan consultor, synodal judge, and vicar for religious.

During Minihan's tenure at St. Theresa's in West Roxbury, he shared the rectory with Father John Cotter.  Cotter was later revealed to be one of the worst child-abusers in the Diocese.   Father Gilbert Phinn, who later went on to be Diocese personnel director, was in the same rectory at the same time.  Phinn was responsible for knowingly distributing abusers like Cotter throughout Boston.  Many parishioners and victims consider Minihan, in his tenure at St. Theresa, as an enabler at best, and a conspirator at worst.

Auxiliary Bishop of Boston
On May 21, 1954, Minihan was appointed auxiliary bishop of Boston and titular bishop of Paphos by Pope Pius XII. He received his episcopal consecration on the following September 8 from Cardinal Richard Cushing, with Bishops John Joseph Wright and Vincent Stanislaus Waters serving as co-consecrators. As an auxiliary bishop, he served as regional bishop for the North Pastoral Region.

Minihan died while on vacation in Dublin, at age 70.

See also

 Catholic Church hierarchy
 Catholic Church in the United States
 Historical list of the Catholic bishops of the United States
 List of the Catholic bishops of the United States
 Lists of patriarchs, archbishops, and bishops

References

External links
Roman Catholic Archdiocese of Boston

Episcopal succession

1903 births
1973 deaths
Participants in the Second Vatican Council
People from Haverhill, Massachusetts
Roman Catholic Archdiocese of Boston
Georgetown Hoyas football players
20th-century Roman Catholic bishops in the United States
Religious leaders from Massachusetts
Catholics from Massachusetts
American Roman Catholic clergy of Irish descent